Mischarytera macrobotrys is a species of rainforest trees, of the flowering plant family Sapindaceae. They grow naturally in Cape York Peninsula, Queensland, Australia and Papua New Guinea.

References

External links

Sapindaceae
Sapindales of Australia
Flora of Papua New Guinea
Least concern flora of Australia
Flora of Queensland
Least concern biota of Queensland
Taxonomy articles created by Polbot